Cheong Jun Hoong  (born 16 April 1990) is a Malaysian diver. She won a silver medal in the synchronised 10m platform event with Pandelela Rinong at the 2016 Summer Olympics. At the 2017 World Aquatics Championships, she became Malaysia's first diving world champion after winning the 10m platform event.

Early and personal life
Cheong Jun Hoong was born in Ipoh, Perak. She is the daughter of Cheong Sun Meng and Leow Lai Kuan. She has a younger sister. Her fascination in aquatics began at the age of four. At age nine, she started her training in diving with Perak's state coach, Zhou Xiyang. In 2004, she was offered a place at the Bukit Jalil Sports School. She graduated with a bachelor's degree in Communications from Universiti Putra Malaysia.

Career
Cheong won a bronze medal in 1m springboard at the 2010 Asian Games. She made her Olympic debut at the 2012 London Olympics where she finished 20th in 3m springboard and eighth in 3m synchronized springboard with Pandelela Rinong.

Cheong represented Malaysia at the 2014 Commonwealth Games, where she competed in the 1 m, 3 m, and 10 m events. She placed 8th in the 1 m event, 12th in the 3 m event, 5th in the 3 m synchronised event,  6th in the 10 m event and 4th in the 10 m synchro event with partner Leong Mun Yee, narrowly losing the bronze medal to fellow athletes Pandelela Rinong and Nur Dhabitah Sabri. At the 2014 Asian Games in Incheon, she won a silver medal in 3m synchro springboard with Ng Yan Yee. She also won a bronze medal in individual 3m event.

In August 2016, she participated at the Rio Summer Olympics in the 3m platform,
10m synchronized platform with Pandelela Rinong and 3m synchronized springboard with Nur Dhabitah Sabri. She won her first Olympic medal, a silver in the 10m synchronized platform with a final score of 344.34. However, she did not qualify for the final of the 3m event. She placed 5th in the 3m synchro event. Due to her persisting back pain, in October 2016 she withdrew from the 2016 FIN A Diving Grand Prix in Kuching, Sarawak.

In June 2017, Cheong returned from a back injury to win the bronze medal in the 1m springboard event at the 7th Asian Diving Cup in Macau after withdrawing from the Kazan and Windsor legs of the 2017 FINA Diving World Series earlier.  Cheong became Malaysia's first diving World Champion, when she took home the gold medal in the 10m platform event in the 2017 World Aquatics Championships in Budapest, pipping her closest rival by just 1.5 points. Four of the seven judges gave a perfect 10 on her best dive in the competition, and she finished with an overall score of 397.5. She also won a bronze in the 10m synchronized 10 platform event with Pandelela Rinong with a total score of 328.74.

Cheong was chosen as one of the flag-bearers for Malaysia at the 2017 Southeast Asian Games alongside two reigning world champions cyclist Azizulhasni Awang and silat exponent Mohd Al-Jufferi Jamari.

Retirement
On 4 January 2022, Cheong announced her retirement after her contract as a full-time athlete with the National Sports Council and Malaysia Swimming was not renewed. One of the reasons Cheong provided for her retirement was a second knee injury she acquired in 2018 and had not been able to re-achieve a certain level of performance after getting.

Awards
 OCM-Coca-Cola Olympian Award: 2016
 National Sportswoman of the Year: 2017

Honours

Honours of Malaysia 
  :
  Member of the Order of the Defender of the Realm (A.M.N.) (2017)

References

External links
 
 
 
 
 
 
 
 

1990 births
Living people
People from Ipoh
Malaysian sportspeople of Chinese descent
Malaysian female divers
University of Putra Malaysia alumni
Olympic divers of Malaysia
Divers at the 2012 Summer Olympics
Divers at the 2016 Summer Olympics
Divers at the 2020 Summer Olympics
Divers at the 2006 Commonwealth Games
Divers at the 2010 Commonwealth Games
Divers at the 2014 Commonwealth Games
Divers at the 2018 Commonwealth Games
Asian Games medalists in diving
Divers at the 2010 Asian Games
Divers at the 2014 Asian Games
Olympic silver medalists for Malaysia
Medalists at the 2016 Summer Olympics
Olympic medalists in diving
Asian Games silver medalists for Malaysia
Asian Games bronze medalists for Malaysia
Medalists at the 2010 Asian Games
Medalists at the 2014 Asian Games
World Aquatics Championships medalists in diving
Commonwealth Games medallists in diving
Commonwealth Games gold medallists for Malaysia
Southeast Asian Games gold medalists for Malaysia
Southeast Asian Games silver medalists for Malaysia
Southeast Asian Games bronze medalists for Malaysia
Southeast Asian Games medalists in diving
Members of the Order of the Defender of the Realm
Competitors at the 2007 Southeast Asian Games
Competitors at the 2011 Southeast Asian Games
Competitors at the 2013 Southeast Asian Games
Competitors at the 2015 Southeast Asian Games
Competitors at the 2017 Southeast Asian Games
21st-century Malaysian women
Medallists at the 2018 Commonwealth Games